Morten Johansen (born December 25, 1952) is a Norwegian ice hockey player. He played for the Norwegian national ice hockey team, and  participated at the Winter Olympics in 1980. He was awarded Gullpucken as best Norwegian ice hockey player in 1975.

References

1952 births
Living people
Ice hockey players at the 1980 Winter Olympics
Norwegian ice hockey players
Olympic ice hockey players of Norway
Ice hockey people from Oslo